Cierra Fields (born 1999) is a sexual assault activist, Native American community health activist and member of the Cherokee Nation of Oklahoma. Fields works as a freelance journalist for Indian Country Today Media Network.

In 2014, as a Cherokee Nation citizen, Fields advocated for the tribal council to raise the age of consent for sex from 14-years-old to 16-years-old.

In 2016, Field hosted the "Charles Head Memorial Native Youth Summit, an alliance to stop violence against Native American women.

Fields is a melanoma survivor and has worked to improve tribal health facilities. In 2013, she was recognized by the White House as a "Champion for Change" for her work to promote healthier living practices and to reduce cancer in Native American communities. Fields sits on the Board of Directors for the National Urban Indian Youth Alliance.

Awards and recognition
 2013 Center for Native American for Youth Champion for Change Award
 2016 Attendee of the White House United State of Women Summit
 2016 Honoree class of Unity 25 under 25 youth leadership conference
2017 Recipient of $10,000 Make Sense Foundation college scholarship
2016 United Nations SustainUS Delegate to the United Nations 58th Commission on the Status of Women 
2016 United State of Women Summit White House Change Maker
2015 Prudential Spirit of Community Award-Bronze Award
2015 Soroptomist International Violet Richardson Southwest Award Winner
2013 Oklahoma’s Governor’s Commendation and creation of Cierra Fields Day On May 9, 2013 for the State of Oklahoma
2014-2017 Center for Native American Youth Advisor
2014-2016 We R Native National Youth Ambassador
2016-2017 Ralience Youth Board Member
2014-2017 White House Tribal Youth Gathering Ambassador
2013-2016 White House Tribal Leaders Conference Cherokee Nation Youth Representative
2014-2016 National Congress of American Indians Youth Cabinet Member
Guest speaker at the Interfaith Service during the Let Freedom Ring 50th Anniversary of Martin Luther  King’s historic march on Washington D.C.
2013 Cherokee Nation Tribal Resolution #13-042 Recognizing tribal citizen, Cierra Fields
2014 Cherokee Nation Distinguished Spirit of Life Award Winner
2014 President Obama’s Volunteer Service Award Winner

References

Native American activists
1999 births
Living people
American child activists
21st-century American women
21st-century Native American women
21st-century Native Americans